Audio effect may refer to:

Audio signal processing, effects applied to sounds in music production and performance
Effects unit, a device that processes sound
Sound effect, special sounds used in plays and movies